Cherry Mobile is a Philippine mobile phone and electronics brand by Cosmic Technologies, established by Maynard Ngu in 2009. In 2010, barely two years after it started, Cherry Mobile was voted IT Company of the Year in the 3rd CyberPress Awards, upstaging some of the country's technology giants. The company imports mobile phones manufactured by original design manufacturers in China and markets them under the Cherry Mobile brand. Most of Cherry Mobile's current lineup come with Wi-Fi, capacitive touch screens and run on the Android, Windows, and Windows Phone operating systems; a line of smart feature phones running Firefox OS named Cherry Mobile Ace was also sold by the company for a time before it was later discontinued.

History
Apart from being the first legal mobile phone brand with dual and triple Subscriber Identity Module (SIM) systems in the Philippines, Cherry Mobile also marketed the first Windows-enabled phone in the country as a result of an exclusive partnership with Microsoft.

In 2013 Cherry Mobile expanded its market by distributing their products in Thailand and in Myanmar.

In 2015, Cosmic Technologies, along with rival mobile device company MyPhone, partnered with Google for the Android One initiative, both of them releasing their respective devices based on Google's reference designs using MediaTek's quad-core MT6582 system-on-chip.

In June 2015, Cosmic Technologies announced that they will be launching two Windows Phone handsets preloaded with Windows 10 Mobile under their mobile phone brand, namely the Alpha Prime 4 and the Alpha Prime 5, which was released in the second half of 2015. Both devices came with a 1.1 GHz quad core Qualcomm Snapdragon 210, support for WCDMA 900/2100, FDD-LTE B1/B3/B5/B7, and a 2 megapixel front-facing camera. The Alpha Prime 4 will have a 4-inch screen, a 5 megapixel main camera, 4 GB of ROM, and 512 MB of RAM, while the Alpha Prime 5 will have a 5-inch screen, 8 megapixel main camera, 8 GB of ROM and 1 GB of RAM.

Cherry Mobile Flare S7 series' specifications and design were leaked ahead of their launch on 12 October 2018. Its design for the S7 Deluxe and Plus series were using the long notch from the iPhone XS.

In 2016, Cherry Mobile established official presence in Europe. It started distributing its products in Germany.

Cherry Mobile was placed under a bigger brand known as Cherry in 2020, along with other brands by Cosmic Technologies including Cherry Prepaid, Cherryroam, Cherry Home, and Cherry Pet.

Cubix
In 2015, Cosmic Technologies introduced a new smartphone brand named Cubix, with its first product being the Cubix Cube. The Cubix brand is Cosmic's response to the growing segment of budget-priced midrange phones, usually dominated by Chinese brands such as Lenovo. The Cubix Cube has 2 GB of RAM, 16 GB of ROM, a 13 megapixel rear camera and an 8 megapixel front camera. The phone also comes bundled with the Lazada app and is available through Lazada Philippines.

Flare

See also
List of mobile phone makers by country
List of Android smartphones
MyPhone
Torque Mobile

References

Philippine brands
2009 introductions
Telecommunications in the Philippines